Yuri Anatolyevich Nagaytsev (born 19 April 1973) is a Latvian football coach and a former player of Russian descent. He is the senior coach with FC Torpedo Moscow.

Coaching career
On 11 September 2022, Nagaytsev was appointed caretaker manager of the Russian Premier League club FC Akhmat Grozny, following dismissal of Andrei Talalayev. Nagaytsev worked as Talalayev's assistant at his last five clubs, including Akhmat. Sergei Tashuyev was appointed as permanent manager on 22 September 2022.

References

External links
 
 Russian Premier League profile

1973 births
Footballers from Riga
Living people
Soviet footballers
Latvian footballers
Association football midfielders
FK Auda players
Latvian Higher League players
Latvian football managers
FC Akhmat Grozny managers
Russian Premier League managers
Latvian expatriate football managers
Expatriate football managers in Russia
Latvian expatriate sportspeople in Russia
Expatriate football managers in Armenia
Latvian expatriate sportspeople in Armenia